Alfred Dockery (December 11, 1797 – December 3, 1873) was an American Congressional Representative from North Carolina.

Early life and career
Alfred Dockery was born near Rockingham, North Carolina. He attended the public schools and engaged in planting. Dockery was a member of the North Carolina House of Commons in 1822. He was also the father of Oliver Hart Dockery, who was born in 1830. Dockery was a member of the State constitutional convention in 1835, where he advocated the liberal position "that free blacks should continue to be allowed to vote, which the convention rejected."

He then served in the North Carolina State Senate from 1836 to 1844.

Dockery was elected as a Whig to the Twenty-ninth Congress (March 4, 1845 – March 3, 1847). He declined to be a candidate for re-election in 1846 to the Thirtieth Congress, but was elected to the Thirty-second Congress (March 4, 1851 – March 3, 1853). He was the unsuccessful Whig candidate for Governor of North Carolina in 1854.

Later life
After the Civil War, he mostly retired from public service and returned to being a planter for his remaining years. He was the National Union (Republican) candidate for governor in 1866, but he did not seek the nomination, or campaign for the position. The conservative incumbent Governor, Jonathan Worth, won the election easily amid low turnout.

Dockery died in Rockingham, Richmond County, N.C. and was interred there in the family cemetery.

The Alfred Dockery House near Rockingham was listed on the National Register of Historic Places in 1986.

See also
Twenty-ninth United States Congress
Thirty-second United States Congress

References
 U.S. Congressional Biographical Directory

Notes

1797 births
1873 deaths
Republican Party members of the North Carolina House of Representatives
Republican Party North Carolina state senators
People of North Carolina in the American Civil War
Whig Party members of the United States House of Representatives from North Carolina
19th-century American politicians
People from Rockingham, North Carolina